Birahim Diop (born 26 January 1982) is a naturalized Equatoguinean football defender, who plays for Peñarroya in the Spanish Primera Andaluza (Group 2).

Honours

Club 
 Renacimiento FC
 Equatoguinean Premier League: 2006, 2007

International
Equatorial Guinea
 CEMAC Cup: 2006

National team
Diop was playing in a Senegalese club until that he has been sold to an Equatoguinean club (Renacimiento FC). There the coach of the Equatoguinean national team (that in this moment was the Brazilian Antônio Dumas) proposed him to play him with his selection. This way, he has adopted the Equatoguinean nationality, and he already takes 20 matches with the national team. .

Diop played also a friendly match against the Brazilian side Cruzeiro and other against the team of Pará de Minas (Minas Gerais, Brasil) in the Estádio Ovídio de Abreu on 5 December 2005. He was part of the Equatoguinean team in the Mundialito de la Inmigración y la Solidaridad 2009 in Madrid, Spain.

References

External links

1982 births
Living people
Footballers from Dakar
Equatoguinean footballers
Equatorial Guinea international footballers
Senegalese footballers
Naturalized citizens of Equatorial Guinea
Senegalese emigrants to Equatorial Guinea
Renacimiento FC players
Equatoguinean expatriate footballers
Expatriate footballers in Spain
Association football defenders